Michael Louis Golic Jr. (born September 28, 1989) is a broadcaster and podcast host. He was most recently affiliated with ESPN Radio (until 2/8/2022) and was an American football offensive guard. He played college football at Notre Dame. He signed with the Pittsburgh Steelers as an undrafted free agent in 2013.

Early years 
Golic attended Northwest Catholic High School in West Hartford, Connecticut, where he was a standout lineman for the Northwest Catholic Indians high school football team. He was selected to play in the U.S. Army All-American Bowl in San Antonio. He was named to the Connecticut High School Coaches Association Class S all-state team in both his junior and senior season.

College career 
Golic played college football at Notre Dame. On November 8, 2012, he was selected to the Capital One Academic All-District V team and on December 6, 2012 he also was selected to the Capital One Academic All-America Football Team along with his Notre Dame Fighting Irish teammate Manti Te'o.

Professional career

Pittsburgh Steelers 
On April 27, 2013, he signed with the Pittsburgh Steelers as an undrafted free agent.  On August 31, 2013, the Steelers announced that he was among the players cut to reach their 53-man roster.

New Orleans Saints 
On May 10, 2014 the New Orleans Saints signed Golic to a two-year deal.
He was then waived from the Saints on June 2, 2014. Golic re-signed with the New Orleans Saints on  April 16, 2015 and was released by the team on September 5, 2015.

Montreal Alouettes 
Following his release from the Saints, Golic took part in the Montreal Alouettes training camp. He joined the team on June 11 but was released prior to the start of the season.

Arizona Rattlers 
On September 25, 2014, Golic was assigned to the Arizona Rattlers of the Arena Football League (AFL). On November 11, 2015, Golic was placed on recallable reassignment.

Retirement 
On August 19, 2016, while co-hosting The Dan Le Batard Show with Stugotz, Golic announced his retirement from professional football.

Broadcasting career

ESPN Radio 
As of April 4, 2016, Golic is the host of First and Last. He was also a regular guest co-host of Mike & Mike (normally filling in for his dad), and subsequently became a regular on the succeeding program Golic and Wingo in November 2017. He also co-hosted "Weekend Observations" with Jon "Stugotz" Weiner from February 12, 2017 through February 4, 2018.

On August 17, 2020, Golic Jr. and his new partner, Chiney Ogwumike, debuted their new afternoon drive radio show, Chiney & Golic Jr., on ESPN Radio from 4 p.m. to 7 p.m. ET. Chiney Ogwumike left the show in the fall of 2021 to take over duties as a regular analyst on ESPN's NBA Today. Chris Canty took over her post. On February 8, 2022, Golic used his Twitter account to announce that he had worked his last day at ESPN.

Personal life 
Golic was born in Voorhees, New Jersey, to parents Mike and Christine Golic. His father Mike Golic was a defensive tackle in the National Football League where he played eight seasons. His uncle Bob Golic was a defensive tackle in the National Football League for fourteen seasons and was selected for three Pro Bowls and two All-Pro teams. His younger brother Jake Golic was a tight end at Notre Dame and Cincinnati.

His father is the former co-host (with Mike Greenberg) of ESPN Radio's Mike & Mike; that show ended on November 17, 2017, and ten days later, Mike Jr. joined his father alongside Trey Wingo for its successor program, Golic and Wingo.

References

External links 
Notre Dame Fighting Irish bio
Pittsburgh Steelers profile
ESPN stats

1989 births
Living people
Notre Dame Fighting Irish football players
People from West Hartford, Connecticut
People from Voorhees Township, New Jersey
Pittsburgh Steelers players
Arizona Rattlers players
Brooklyn Bolts players
New Orleans Saints players
College football announcers